Danilo da Silva is a Portuguese name, may refer to:
Danilo Aparecido da Silva - The most notable  Danilo da Silva, Brazilian footballer
José Marcio Danilo Pereira da Silva, Brazilian footballer
Danilo Clementino, full name Emmanuel Danilo Clementino Silva, Equatoguinean footballer

See also
Daniel da Silva (disambiguation)
Daniel Silva (disambiguation)